Beck Mountain is a summit in St. Francois County in the U.S. state of Missouri.

The peak lies southeast of Farmington and the St. Francis River flows past its southwest side. Rickus Hill lies to the southeast.

Beck Mountain has the name of Andrew Beck, a pioneer citizen.

References

Mountains of St. Francois County, Missouri
Mountains of Missouri